Edwin George McLeod (14 October 1900 – 14 September 1989) was a New Zealand cricketer who played in one Test in 1930. He was also an international hockey player who captained New Zealand.

Cricket career
McLeod was a middle-order and opening batsman who also bowled leg-spin. He played for Auckland from 1920–21 to 1923–24, and for Wellington from 1925–26 to 1940–41. He captained Wellington in 1939-40 and 1940–41.

When the MCC toured New Zealand to play New Zealand's first Test series in 1929–30, McLeod scored 37 and 21 not out and took 3 for 7 and 4 for 56 for Wellington against the tourists. New Zealand lost the First Test shortly afterwards, and McLeod was one of three new players brought in for the Second Test. He was not successful (although New Zealand improved and drew the match) and did not play any further Tests. He made 102 and 35 for Wellington against Auckland two weeks after the Test series ended.

Hockey career
McLeod represented New Zealand in hockey in the 1920s and 1930s. He played in New Zealand's first hockey Test match, against Australia in 1922 at Palmerston North, a game that New Zealand won 5–4. He was the captain of the New Zealand side that played India in a three-Test series in New Zealand in 1935. He later served as a national hockey selector.

See also
 List of Auckland representative cricketers

References

External links
 

1900 births
1989 deaths
Cricketers from Auckland
New Zealand Test cricketers
Pre-1930 New Zealand representative cricketers
New Zealand cricketers
Auckland cricketers
Wellington cricketers
New Zealand male field hockey players
North Island cricketers